All I Fuckin' Know (titled All I "$%*#@*#" Know on the cover) is the second compilation album and seventh album overall by comedian/singer, Eddie Murphy.  The album was released on April 28, 1998, for Sony Records and was produced by Eddie Murphy. All I Fuckin' Know contained both stand-up comedy sketches and songs that Murphy recorded in the 1980s.

Track listing
"Singers"- 10:02 
"Put Your Mouth on Me"- 4:03 
"Doo-Doo/Christmas Gifts"- 6:46 
"Buckwheat"- 2:01 
"TV"- 2:01 
"With All I Know"- 4:04 
"Politics, Racism"- 4:32 
"Ice Cream Man/Shoe Throwin' Mothers"- 5:49 
"Boogie in Your Butt"- 4:04 
"Till the Money's Gone"- 5:14

References

1998 compilation albums
Sony Records compilation albums
1990s comedy albums
Comedy compilation albums
Eddie Murphy compilation albums